{{DISPLAYTITLE:C17H19N3O3S}}
The molecular formula C17H19N3O3S (molar mass: 345.417 g/mol, exact mass: 345.1147 u) may refer to:

 Esomeprazole
 Omeprazole

Molecular formulas